Entente Sportive Thaon-les-Vosges, known as ES Thaon or Thaon, is a French football club based in Thaon-les-Vosges, Vosges. It was founded in 1920. The club currently plays in the Championnat National 3, the fifth tier of the French football league system.

History  
The club was founded in 1920.

On 7 January 2023, Thaon, while playing in the fifth-tier of French football, eliminated professional Ligue 2 side Amiens from the Coupe de France. Despite being down to ten men, Thaon held a 0–0 draw before winning 4–2 on penalties. The club repeated himself with a 0–0 draw against Ligue 1 side FC Nantes, however the game end with a loss in the penalties after Théo Gazagnes and Victor Didierjean's mistakes.

References

External links

Association football clubs established in 1920
1920 establishments in France
Sport in Vosges (department)
Football clubs in Grand Est